"Dola Re Dola" is a song from the 2002 Indian period romantic drama film Devdas, directed by Sanjay Leela Bhansali, and starring Shah Rukh Khan, Aishwarya Rai and Madhuri Dixit. The song was composed by Ismail Darbar, with lyrics provided by Nusrat Badr, and sung by Kavita Krishnamurthy, Shreya Ghoshal and KK (backing vocals). The song received high acclaim from critics and audiences alike, becoming a blockbuster due to the unique dance duet between Aishwarya Rai and Madhuri Dixit, two of the leading actresses of the era.

Picturization

The song is picturized on Parvati (Aishwarya Rai) and Chandramukhi (Madhuri Dixit), and appears during the celebration of Durga Puja. Both are expressing the love and ecstasy by their dancing. The video song also had some long takes.

The video of the song is shot in the studios built with a lavish and expensive set. It was the most expensive Bollywood music video up until "Azeem O Shaan Shahenshah" from Jodhaa Akbar (2008).

Choreography

The song in the video was choreographed by Saroj Khan, for which she won her first National Film Award for Best Choreography. The song shows Parvati and Chandramukhi dancing during Durga Puja. The choreography of the song was something different as it was a mix of Indian classical dance forms. The form of dance that Saroj Khan explored with "Dola Re Dola", is called Nautwary. It included steps of Kathak and Bharatnatyam.

Behind-The-Scenes
According to Saroj Khan, this song was one of the toughest she had to endure as Madhuri and Aishwarya are brilliant dancers. She had to balance in giving steps equally good to both that none of them  would feel that they would be left out. But nothing of the sort occurred. During the shot, there were several retakes and at a particular point, they had to perform a step that they had to fall, to be perfectly in sync with the beats. It became physically demanding for both actresses. Sanjay Leela Bhansali was involved in the dance sequences.

During the shoot, Aishwarya's ears started to bleed because of the heavy earrings, but she didn't say it and continued to shoot until it was completed.

Reception
The song became an instant hit, as it combined the 2 leading heroines of the era in a unique dance song. The song received numerous awards in categories of singing and choreography.

Accolades

See also
Devdas
Bairi Piya

References

2002 songs
Indian songs
Hindi film songs
Shreya Ghoshal songs
Kavita Krishnamurthy songs
Songs with music by Ismail Darbar